Clyde Howard Bliss (July 26, 1916 – June 7, 2005) was an American football player and coach. He served as the head football coach at Valley City State Teachers College—now known as Valley City State University—in 1947 and North Dakota Agricultural College—now known as North Dakota State University—compiling a career college football coaching record of 9–17.

Playing career
Bliss was a quarterback at Purdue University, earning a varsity letter in 1938.

Military service
Bliss served in the United States army from July 5, 1942 to May 18, 1946. He was a captain in field artillery.

Coaching career
Bliss began his coaching career at the Montpelier High School in Montpelier, Ohio. After briefly attending the University of Michigan and serving in World War II, he became an assistant coach at Miami University in Oxford, Ohio. He was hired as the head football coach and athletic director at Valley City State University in Valley City, North Dakota in 1947.

Bliss was then hired as the head football coach at North Dakota State University–then known as North Dakota Agricultural College–where he served from 1948 to 1949.

Later life and death
After retiring from coaching, Bliss worked for General Tire Company. He died in 2005.

Head coaching record

College

References

1916 births
2005 deaths
American football quarterbacks
Miami RedHawks football coaches
North Dakota State Bison football coaches
Purdue Boilermakers football players
Valley City State Vikings athletic directors
Valley City State Vikings football coaches
High school football coaches in Ohio
People from Farmville, Virginia
Players of American football from Virginia
United States Army officers